Harald "Halle" Janemar (May 4, 1920 – February 14, 2016) was a Swedish speed skater who competed in the 1948 Winter Olympics. He finished eleventh in the 500 metres competition.

References

External links
Speed skating 1948  

1920 births
2016 deaths
Swedish male speed skaters
Olympic speed skaters of Sweden
Speed skaters at the 1948 Winter Olympics
20th-century Swedish people